El Aroussa is a town and commune in the Siliana Governorate, Tunisia. As of 2004, it had a population of 2,621.

See also
List of cities in Tunisia

References

Populated places in Tunisia
Communes of Tunisia